This is a timeline of Latvian history, comprising important legal and territorial changes and political events in Latvia and its predecessor states.  To read about the background to these events, see History of Latvia.  See also the list of presidents of Latvia.

7th century

8th century

9th century

10th century

11th century

12th century

13th century

14th century

15th century

16th century

17th century

18th century

19th century

20th century

21st century

See also
 List of years in Latvia
 Timeline of Riga

References

Further reading

External links
 

Years in Latvia
Latvia history-related lists
Latvian